Larry O'Neal (born May 5, 1949) is an American politician from Georgia. O'Neal is a Republican member of the Georgia House of Representatives from the 146th district, serving since 2001.

See also 
 2013 152nd Georgia General Assembly

References

External links 
 Larry O'Neal at ourcampaigns.com

Living people
Republican Party members of the Georgia House of Representatives
1949 births
Politicians from Jacksonville, Florida
21st-century American politicians